Charleston County Courthouse (1790–92) is a Neoclassical building in Charleston, South Carolina, designed by Irish architect James Hoban. It was a likely model for Hoban's most famous building, the U.S. White House, and both buildings are modeled after Leinster House, the current seat of the Irish Parliament in Dublin.

President George Washington visited Charleston on his Southern Tour in May 1791, may have met with Hoban, and summoned the architect to Philadelphia, Pennsylvania, (the temporary national capital) in June 1792. The following month, Hoban was named the winner of the design competition for the presidential mansion in Washington, D.C. He later altered his design under Washington's influence.

In 1883–1884, the courthouse underwent a large renovation performed by Kerrigan & Grant.

The Courthouse itself is still in use, located in the historic district near the park at Washington Square. It was built on the site of and incorporated the ruins of the South Carolina Statehouse (1753, burned 1788), the capitol building for the Colony of South Carolina under British Rule. Hoban also designed a new statehouse building nearby, which was burned down during the Civil War.

See also
 Court House Square (Charleston)
 Charleston Historic District
 South Carolina Provincial Congress

References

External links

Charleston County Courthouse from National Park Service.

Government buildings completed in 1792
White House
Neoclassical architecture in South Carolina
Buildings and structures in Charleston, South Carolina
County courthouses in South Carolina
Historic district contributing properties in South Carolina
National Register of Historic Places in Charleston, South Carolina
Courthouses on the National Register of Historic Places in South Carolina
James Hoban buildings